The Reserve Forces Act 1900 (63 & 64 Vict. c.42), long title An Act to amend the Reserve Forces Act, 1882, was an Act of Parliament of the Parliament of the United Kingdom, given the Royal Assent on 6 August 1900 and fully repealed in 1950.

The Act amended the Reserve Forces Act 1882 in two ways. Section 1 provided that it was henceforth permissible to call out the second division of the first class of the Army Reserve for active service, regardless of whether or not the first division had been called out. However, no man who had entered the second division before the Act was passed would be liable under this section, without their consent.

Section 2 modified section 10 subsection 4 of the 1882 Act, which dealt with the rank of a militia reservist on his return to the militia, and provided that:
 The militia rank of any man returned to the militia was not to be lower than that to which he was entitled to immediately before he was released from permanent service
 If, whilst on permanent service, his rank had been reduced below his militia rank, and he continued in the lower rank until released, then he would retain the lower rank on return to the militia.
 If he served in permanent service as a private, though entitled to a higher rank in the militia, and was given any punishment which would have reduced his rank had he been ranked above private, then his militia rank was to be reduced accordingly.
 If any alteration was made to the militia rank as a result of these provisions, his pay was to be adjusted accordingly.

Section 2 of the Act was repealed by the Territorial Army and Militia Act 1921, and the residue was repealed by the Army Reserve Act 1950.

References
The public general acts passed in the sixty-third and sixty-third and sixty-fourth years of the reign of her majesty Queen Victoria. London: printed for Her Majesty's Stationery Office. 1900.
Chronological table of the statutes; HMSO, London. 1993.

United Kingdom Acts of Parliament 1900
1900 in military history
United Kingdom military law
Repealed United Kingdom Acts of Parliament